Giraud Peak is a  mountain summit located west of the crest of the Sierra Nevada mountain range, in Fresno County of northern California, United States. Giraud Peak ranks as the 258th-highest summit in California. On the direct opposite side of the canyon The Citadel stands guard. The first ascent of the summit was made September 1, 1925, by Norman Clyde via the east arête.

Etymology
This mountain's name has been officially adopted by the United States Board on Geographic Names. It was probably named for Pierre "Little Pete" Giraud (1874–1907), a shepherd of Inyo County who was made famous in Mary Austin's 1906 book, The Flock. Pierre and his younger brother, Alfred, were French immigrants who arrived in the Owens Valley, where they grazed sheep for many years at the head of the South and Middle Forks of Kings River.

Climate
Giraud Peak is located in an alpine climate zone. Most weather fronts originate in the Pacific Ocean, and travel east toward the Sierra Nevada mountains. As fronts approach, they are forced upward by the peaks, causing them to drop their moisture in the form of rain or snowfall onto the range (orographic lift). Precipitation runoff from this mountain drains into tributaries of the Middle Fork Kings River.

Gallery

See also

 List of mountain peaks of California

References

External links
 Weather forecast: Giraud Peak
 Pierre Joseph Giraud photo (Page 26, with bear)

Mountains of Fresno County, California
Mountains of Kings Canyon National Park
North American 3000 m summits
Mountains of Northern California
Sierra Nevada (United States)